Prospect Hill is a small unincorporated community in Hightowers Township, Caswell County, North Carolina, United States. It lies at the intersection of North Carolina Highways 49 and 86. It is in extreme southeastern Caswell County.

Warren House and Warren's Store are listed on the National Register of Historic Places in 1973.

Sugartree Creek, a tributary to South Hyco Creek, rises in this community.

References

External links
 Prospect Hill at the U.S. Geographic Names Information System

Unincorporated communities in Caswell County, North Carolina